The 2003 Liga Perdana 1 season is the sixth and final season of Liga Perdana 1. A total of 13 teams participated in the season out of 14 as NS Chempaka FC withdrew from the league.

The Liga Perdana 1 was introduced in 1998. It replaced the Liga Perdana (1994–97) as the top-tier football league in Malaysia.

The season kicked off on 9 February 2003. Perak again dominated the season and ended up winning the title. Perlis's Phillimon Chepita was the season's top goalscorer with 23 goals.

This season also the last season before the league was succeeded by the formation of Liga Super from 2004 season onwards while Liga Premier was formed to become the new second-tier league in Malaysian football league system. The teams from 2003 season undergoes a qualifying stage to be promoted into inaugural 2004 Malaysia Super League.

Teams

A total of 13 teams will participate in the 2003 Liga Perdana 1 season.  NS Chempaka FC pulled out of the league.

 Perak FA (2002 Liga Perdana 1 champions)
 Selangor FA
 Sabah FA
 Penang FA
 Terengganu FA
 Johor FC
 Perlis FA
 Sarawak FA
 Pahang FA
 Kelantan FA
 Malacca FA
 Kedah FA (Promoted as 2002 Liga Perdana 2 champions)
 Melaka Telekom (Promoted as 2002 Liga Perdana 2 runner-up)

Note:

 NS Chempaka FC pulled out of the league.

League table

 Note
Clubs places 1st to 6th will be entering Liga Super automatically.
Clubs places 7th to 10th will be entering Liga Super playoffs.
Clubs places 11th to 13th will be relegating to Liga Premier.

2004 Malaysia Super League playoffs

A total of 8 teams will participate in the 2004 Malaysia Super League season playoffs.

 Johor FC (2003 Liga Perdana 1 7th place)
 Sarawak FA (2003 Liga Perdana 1 8th place)
 Melaka Telekom (2003 Liga Perdana 1 9th place)
 Kelantan FA (2003 Liga Perdana 1 10th place)
 Public Bank FC (2003 Liga Perdana 2 champions)
 Negeri Sembilan FA (2003 Liga Perdana 2 runners-up)
 Johor FA (2003 Liga Perdana 2 3rd place)
 MPPJ (2003 Liga Perdana 2 4th place)

Results

First round

First Legs

Second Legs

 MPPJ qualified 6-5 on aggregate.

 Public Bank FC qualified 6-4 on aggregate.

 Sarawak FA qualified 4-1 on aggregate.

 Johor FC qualified 1-1 on aggregate, 4-2 on penalties.

Final Round

First Legs

Second Legs

 Sarawak FA qualified 5-4 on aggregate.

 Public Bank FC qualified 3-3 on aggregate, 5-4 on penalties.

 Note

 Sarawak FA and  Public Bank FC qualifies for 2004 Malaysia Super League.

Season statistics

Top goalscorers

Source: FIFA: Liga Perdana 1 Scorers''

Champions

References

External links
2003 season at rsssf.com

Liga Perdana 1 seasons
1
Malayasia
Malayasia